Oops! Here I Go Again is the debut album by former Honey Cone vocalist Edna Wright. It was produced by her husband Greg Perry and released on RCA Victor in 1977.

Samples
De La Soul sampled "Oops! Here I Go Again" on their song "Pass The Plugs" on their second album De La Soul Is Dead in 1991.

Track listing
Oops! Here I Go Again - (Edna Wright, Greg Perry, Billy Smith)  3:57
Spend the Nights With Me (Edna Wright, Angelo Bond, Terrance Harrison)  4:06
Tomorrow May Never Come - (Edna Wright, Angelo Bond)   3:39
Nothing Comes To a Sleeper (But a Dream) - (Edna Wright, Angelo Bond, Terrance Harrison, Greg Perry)  4:10
You Can't See the Forest (For the Trees) - (Edna Wright, Angelo Bond)   6:17
Come On Down (Get Your Head Out of the Clouds) - (Edna Wright, Angelo Bond)   5:49
If the Price is Right - (Edna Wright, Angelo Bond)  6:28

Personnel
Edna Wright - Lead and Backing Vocals
Ray Parker Jr., David Pruitt  - Guitar
Chuck Boyd - Bass
Sylvester Rivers, William Smith - Keyboards
Larry Tolbert - Drums
Leslie Bass - Percussion
Sidney Barnes, Dennis Perry, Anita Sherman, Ernie Smith - Backing Vocals

External links
 Edna Wright-Oops! Here I Go Again at Discogs

References

1977 debut albums
RCA Victor albums